Rhacophorus borneensis is a species of frog in the family Rhacophoridae. This recently (2013) described species is endemic to Malaysian Borneo where it is known from its type locality in the Maliau Basin Conservation Area, Sandakan Division, Sabah as well as from the Batang Ai National Park, Sarawak. Prior to its description, it was included in Rhacophorus reinwardtii. It is said to be "one of the prettiest frogs of Borneo". Common name Borneo flying frog has been coined for it.

Description
The type series consists of an adult male and female in amplexus. The male measured  in snout–vent length (SVL) and the female .

The body is dorsoventrally compressed. The snout is rounded dorsally and sloping downwards in profile. The eyes are large and protuberant. The canthus is distinct and blunt. The tympanum is distinct and subcircular; the supra-tympanic fold is oblique. The fingers and toes have large discs and are broadly webbed. The dorsum is smooth and uniformly green, although some specimens may have dark spots. The lips are white. The lower parts are immaculate yellowish orange, with chin mottled with small, back spots. The webbing is dorsally black with fine blue streaks.

The male advertisement call is a low chuckle, likened to a woodpecker.

Habitat
No tadpoles nor eggs were found. Frog species sharing the same habitat included Chiromantis inexpectatus, Kurixalus appendiculatus, Polypedates macrotis, and Microhyla petrigena. Chiromantis inexpectatus was described based on specimens from the same pool. Outside breeding season, Rhacophorus borneensis live high up in the canopy and are difficult to observe. The species is found in primary forest as well as in secondary or disturbed forest.

Conservation
As of late 2017, the species had not been assessed by the International Union for Conservation of Nature. The type locality, Maliau Basin Conservation Area, is not easy accessible, whereas the other known locality is a protected area, Batang Ai National Park.

References

borneensis
Endemic fauna of Borneo
Endemic fauna of Malaysia
Amphibians of Malaysia
Amphibians described in 2013
Amphibians of Borneo